The Minar was a staged, tower-like structure built in the center of the Sasanian circular city of Gōr (modern Firuzabad, Iran). Several theories have been proposed for its purpose. Only the core of the structure remains today.

Description and history 

The structure is known as Minar (literally "pillar") or Minaret in New Persian, while the medieval Arabic-language Islamic sources referred to the structure as Terbal ( Ṭirbāl).

Similar structures, i.e., staged tower with an outside ramp, have been recorded by ancient historians, including a tower mentioned by Ammianus Marcellinus at the Nahar Malka (near the Sasanian capital Ctesiphon; he compared it to the Lighthouse of Alexandria), several towers at Pirisabora (al-Anbar) mentioned by Zosimus, and the Borsippa tower near Babylon. These in turn may have been based on the ziggurats of the ancient Near East.

Ardashir I's new city of Gor had a circular plan with the official buildings located at the centre of an inner circle  in radius. The tower-like structure of Terbal was located at the very centre of this circle. Together with Takht-e Neshin, these are the only structures of the city that are made of granite-mortar-masonry. According to Iranica, these two structures may have been confused in medieval Islamic sources, and it is unclear that the names Aywān kiyākhurra (Istakhri), Gunbad-i Kīrmān (or Gīrmān) and Īrān Garda/Girda (Ibn al-Balkhi) mentioned in these sources refer to which structure. It was the core of a stair-tower, and was compared by Ibn Hawqal to a similar edifice at Balkh (a reference to a Buddhist stupa, or possibly a ziggurat). The remaining structure is hollow, according to the Qajar period writer Forsat-od-Dowleh Shirazi. Ernst Herzfeld (1907) had described it as a tower of a square ground plan with a spiral outer ramp. According to Dieulafoy (in his L'Art Antique de la Perse), who had examined the structure, it was "composed above the platform, of four stages ...

Purpose 

Among Western orientalists and travellers, the structure was first observed by Eugène Flandin and Pascal Coste, who noted its uniqueness in Iranian architecture. Prior to Ernst Herzfeld studies of the structure, Terbal was mistakenly thought to be a descendant of the ziggurat, while some thought it is a fire temple, with the Holy Fire (Atar) being put at its top to avoid contamination with dust.

It is hypothesised that the structure may have been part of a government building and symbolised the divine and centralist kingship introduced by Ardashir I. It may have had practical military and civil uses as well, as the tower provided visual contact with some fortifications in the area, and/or may have been used as an observation tower to survey activities during the implementation of the planned scheme of the new city of Gor and the plain. In fact, this grand scheme was centred in Terbal and continued the concentric and radiant pattern of the town, with traces of canals, paths, walls and field borders found up to 10 km distant from this central tower.

According to a newer study, the structure, as also described in medieval sources, may have functioned as a water tower, in such a way that water from nearby elevated sources would flow through tubes and Terbal's hollow core towards its dome, and from there it would be flowed to another tube to flow elsewhere in the town. It is argued that it was not the only purpose of the structure, but it was also part of a temple of Anahita, the divinity of the Waters (aban).

Influence 
It is thought that the Terbal was the architectural predecessor of the unique minaret  (known as the malwiya) of Great Mosque of Samarra in Iraq, which was built in the Abbasid period. The minaret itself inspired that of the Mosque of Ibn Tulun in Cairo, Egypt, and recently Philip Johnson's design for the 1976 Chapel of Thanksgiving at Thanks-Giving Square in Dallas, Texas.

See also
The Wonderful Barn

References

External links

 «طربال» in Dehkhoda Dictionary (in Persian)

Towers in Iran
Observation towers
Minarets in Iran
Fire temples in Iran
National works of Iran
Ardashir I
Anahita
Water towers
Reservoirs in Iran
Gor (Sasanian city)
Sasanian architecture